Rushforth Lake is a lake in the Hayes River drainage basin in Census Division No. 22 - Thompson-North Central, Northern Region, Manitoba, Canada. The primary inflow and outflow is the Bolton River, whose waters eventually flow into Gods Lake, and via the Gods River and the Hayes River into Hudson Baof the Royal Canadian Air Force, who was born and raised in Eriksdale, Manitoba. Officer Rushforth's plane was shot down over France in 1944.

References

Lakes of Manitoba